Vari is a southern suburb of Athens and former municipality in East Attica, Greece along the Athens coast. Since the 2011 local government reform it is part of the municipality Vari-Voula-Vouliagmeni, of which it is a municipal unit. The municipal unit has an area of 22.633 km2.

Geography
It lies at the southwestern end of the Mesogeia plain and the southeast shoulder of the Hymettus mountain, near the Saronic Gulf coast. Greek National Road 91 connects Vari with Athens city centre and Sounio. Vari's beach is located in an area called Varkiza, a fishing village that joined the municipality of Vari, in 1997. This particular beach has won the blue flag many years in the past, including 2009.

After 1 January 2011 Vari joined Voula and Vouliagmeni, according to Kallikratis regulations, in a joined municipality. Grigoris Konstantellos is the incumbent mayor, elected for a second term at May 26, 2019, for the unified municipality of Vari-Voula-Vouliagmeni. The ancient Athenian deme of Anagyrous was situated here.

Historical population

See also
List of municipalities of Attica

References

External links
Official website 

Populated places in East Attica
Vari-Voula-Vouliagmeni